Ahmad Razif bin Abdul Rahman (born 7 November 1965) was the 14th Menteri Besar (Chief Minister) of the Malaysian state of Terengganu from May 2013 to May 2018. He is a member of the United Malays National Organisation in Malaysia's ruling Barisan Nasional coalition.

Profile
Ahmad Razif, the son of a religious teacher, was raised in Terengganu. He graduated from Universiti Putra Malaysia with a Masters in Science and rose through the ranks of his local UMNO division.

Political career
In 2008, he was elected to the Terengganu State Legislative Assembly for the seat of Seberang Takir, defeating a People's Justice Party (PKR) candidate. The State's incoming Chief Minister Ahmad Said appointed him to the State's Executive Council—akin to a cabinet—with responsibility for education, higher education, science, technology and human resources.

Ahmad Razif retained his assembly seat at the 2013 election. However, the Barisan Nasional state government almost lost its majority in the assembly, clinging to power with a slim 17–15 majority. In response, the coalition's national leader, and the Prime Minister, Najib Razak, pressured Ahmad Said to resign within a year. In May 2013, Ahmad Said stood down and Ahmad Razif was appointed as his replacement. He was sworn into office by Mizan Zainal Abidin, the Sultan of Terengganu, on 13 May.

Ahmad Razif's first task as Chief Minister was to navigate a political crisis when Ahmad Said and two other UMNO assemblymen resigned from UMNO immediately after his appointment, potentially plunging his government into minority status. Ahmad Said stated that he was dissatisfied that he had not been allowed to remain as Chief Minister until after the wedding of his daughter in May 2013. The three assemblymen returned to the party within days, after the intervention of Najib and other senior Barisan Nasional leaders. On 22 April 2016, his 'Datuk Seri' title had been revoked by the Sultan. On 9 December 2016, the Sultan has consented to restore 'Datuk Seri' title to him.

Election results

Honours
  :
  (revoked 22 April 2016)
  Knight Grand Companion of the Order of Sultan Mizan Zainal Abidin of Terengganu (SSMZ) – Dato' Seri (2014) (revoked 22 April 2016 and reinstated 8 December 2016)

References

1965 births
Living people
Malaysian people of Malay descent
Malaysian Muslims
Chief Ministers of Terengganu
People from Terengganu
United Malays National Organisation politicians
Members of the Terengganu State Legislative Assembly
Terengganu state executive councillors
Leaders of the Opposition in the Terengganu State Legislative Assembly